Per Gunnar Börje Berlin (1 August 1921 – 22 December 2011) was a Swedish wrestler who competed in the 73 kg freestyle and Greco-Roman categories. He won a freestyle silver medal at the 1952 Summer Olympics and a Greco-Roman bronze in 1956. He received another bronze medal at the 1949 European Championships, and three times finished fourth in freestyle wrestling: at the 1951 and 1954 world championships and at the 1956 Olympics.

References

External links
 

1921 births
2011 deaths
Olympic wrestlers of Sweden
Wrestlers at the 1952 Summer Olympics
Wrestlers at the 1956 Summer Olympics
Swedish male sport wrestlers
Olympic silver medalists for Sweden
Olympic bronze medalists for Sweden
Olympic medalists in wrestling
Sportspeople from Skåne County
Medalists at the 1956 Summer Olympics
Medalists at the 1952 Summer Olympics